The following is a timeline of the history of the city of Forlì in the Emilia-Romagna region of Italy.

Prior to 20th century

 188 BCE - Via Aemilia (road) built through Forum Livii.
 2nd-4th century CE - Roman Catholic diocese of Forlì established.
 4th century CE - Mercurialis of Forlì becomes bishop.
 1058 - Ravenna-Forli conflict; Forli becomes a "free commune."
 1173 - Fire.
 1180 - Abbey of San Mercuriale belltower built.
 1212 - Civic piazza established.
 1275 - Forces of Guelph Bologna and Ghibelline Forlì fight in the Battle of San Procolo.
 1282 - Battle of Forlì; French and Guelph forces under Jean d'Eppe defeated.
 1315 - Ordelaffi in power.
 1371 -  (citadel) built.
 1418 - Regional  held in Forlì.
 1427 -  (church) built.
 1460 -  built.
 1495 - Printing press in operation.
 1499-1500 -  by forces of Cesare Borgia during the Italian War of 1499–1504.
 1504 - Forlì becomes part of the Papal States.
 1574 -  (learned society) founded.
 1750 -  (library) founded.
 1816 - Parco della Resistenza in Forlì (park) laid out.
 1838 - Pinacoteca Civica di Forlì (museum) founded.
 1859 - Province of Forlì established.
 1861
 Bologna–Forlì railway begins operating.
 Population: 37,648.
 1879 - Meteorological observatory established.
 1881 -  (tram) begins operating.
 1883 -  (tram) begins operating.

20th century

 1901 - Population: 43,321 
 1902 - Camera del Lavoro (labor entity) formed.
 1911 - Population: 45,994.
 1919 - Foot-Ball Club Forlì formed.
 1925 -  (stadium) opens.
 1926 - Forlì railway station opens.
 1931 - Population: 60,824.
 1934 - Forlì Airport built.
 1943 -  begins operating during World War II.
 1944 - September:  by German forces.
 1963 - Archivio di Stato di Forlì (state archives) established.
 1992 - Province renamed "Province of Forlì-Cesena."
 2000 - Teatro Diego Fabbri (theatre) opens.

21st century

 2009 -   held; Roberto Balzani becomes mayor.
 2013 - Population: 116,029.
 2014 - Davide Drei becomes mayor.
 2019 - Gian Luca Zattini becomes mayor.

See also
 
 List of mayors of Forlì
 List of bishops of Forli
  region

Timelines of other cities in the macroregion of Northeast Italy:(it)
 Emilia-Romagna region: Timeline of Bologna; Ferrara; Modena; Parma; Piacenza; Ravenna; Reggio Emilia; Rimini
 Friuli-Venezia Giulia region: Timeline of Trieste
 Trentino-South Tyrol region: Timeline of Trento
 Veneto region: Timeline of Padua; Treviso; Venice; Verona; Vicenza

References

This article incorporates information from the Italian Wikipedia.

Bibliography

in English

in Italian
  (Written in 15th century) 
  (Written in 16th century)
 
 Q. Marchesi. Supplemento istorico dell'antica città di Forlì, 1678
 
 
 
  (Bibliography)
 
 
 E. Calzini and G. Mazzatinti. Guida di Forlì, 1893
 E. Casadei. Forlì e dintorni, Società Tipografica Forlivese, 1928
 
 Storia di Forlì, Nuova Alfa Editoriale, 1989 (3 volumes)

External links

  (Information about Forlì city archives)
 Items related to Forlì, various dates (via Europeana)
 Items related to Forlì, various dates (via Digital Public Library of America)

Forlì
Forli
forli